The Uri Rotstock is a mountain on the territory of Isenthal, Uri, Switzerland and part of the Uri Alps.

In literature

In Alan Dean Foster's 1984 science-fiction novel The I Inside, the great supercomputer known as The Colligatarch, the de facto ruler of the world, is located inside Uri Rotstock.

References

External links

Uri-Rotstock on Hikr
Uri-Rotstock on Summitpost

Mountains of the Alps
Bernese Alps
Mountains of the canton of Uri
Mountains of Switzerland